"Fire Call" is a bugle call which signals that there is a fire on the post or in the vicinity. The call is also used for fire drill.

Music

References 

Bugle calls